The Barlow Planetarium is a planetarium located at the University of Wisconsin-Oshkosh, Fox Cities Campus in Menasha, Wisconsin. Established in 1998, it was the first major planetarium in Wisconsin. It is named after late businessman and mineral collector F. John Barlow.

History 
Barlow Planetarium takes its name from F. John Barlow,  who was the largest private donor to the building of the planetarium. The planetarium opened in March 1998. Its premiere show was "Through the Eyes of Hubble", a program detailing the Hubble Space Telescope's servicing mission and first few years of operation.

Facilities 
The planetarium has a 102-person seating capacity (98 regular chairs, 4 wheelchair positions). Each seat is equipped with an interactive control panel on its armrest that allows the audience to vote during programs. The Barlow has panorama slide projectors and an all-sky system (an all-sky image is a series of six pie-shaped images that are aligned to make a picture fill the dome). Video images can be projected onto the dome from DVD, laser disk, computer, or SVHS tapes. The planetarium is powered by a Digistar II star projector. In 2004 the Barlow acquired a laser projection system that uses a three-color argon laser to draw images set to music on the dome. The planetarium also has a 10,000-watt sound system.

References

External links
Official website

Museums in Winnebago County, Wisconsin
Science museums in Wisconsin
Planetaria in the United States
University museums in Wisconsin